Jens Heinz Richard Knossalla (born 7 July 1986), also known online by his stage name Knossi, is a German entertainer and television presenter. He became known for his participation in various television formats and as a poker commentator, presenter and live streamer. Knossalla describes himself as König des Internets ("King of the Internet") and usually appears with a crown these days.

Career 

Knossalla had his first television appearance in 2008 as a participant in the game show WipeOut – Heul nicht, lauf! on ProSieben. In 2010, he was seen on the TV format Der Kreuzfahrtkönig broadcast on RTL II. In 2011, Knossalla took part on the game show 17 Meter hosted by Joko Winterscheidt and Klaas Heufer-Umlauf. In November 2012, he was seen on VOX as part of the reality series mieten, kaufen, wohnen. In addition, Knossalla played several small roles in the scripted reality series Richter Alexander Hold, Richterin Barbara Salesch, Lenßen & Partner, K11 – Kommissare im Einsatz, Verklag mich doch! and in the soap opera Gute Zeiten, schlechte Zeiten.

In November 2020, Knossalla hosted the fourth episode of the late-night show Täglich frisch geröstet on TVNOW, produced by Stefan Raab. In addition to Knossalla as the "host" and Mark Filatov as a guest, Kai Pflaume appeared in the role of the "roaster".

Personal life 
Knossala was born on 7 July 1986 in Malsch, Karlsruhe, Baden-Württemberg. He is the father of a son born in 2019.

Filmography 
 2020: Kartoffelsalat 3 – Das Musical

Bibliography 
 Knossi. König des Internets. Über meinen Aufstieg und Erfolg als Streamer. Riva, München 2020,  (with eleven guest conttibutions by Robin Schulz among others).

References

External links 

Official website 
Jens Knossalla on IMDb
Jens Knossalla on the website of The Hendon Mob

1986 births
Living people
German male writers